Saeid Hassanipour Sefatazgomi (also Romanized as "Sa’īd Hasanīpūr"; born 24 February 1988 in Rasht) is an Iranian karateka. He started karate with his brother (Vahid) since 1995 at Rasht Electric Club under the supervision of Hossein Navidi. He started karate with SKI Shotokan style and played in Electric Club for five years, and then joined Yadegar-e Emam Club for an active presence in the world of the championship to work under Massoud Rahnama. Hassanipour won his first official international medal in Cyprus in 2005, winning the gold medal at the international campaigns, and South Korea's Incheon was the only Gilani gold medalist at the Asian Games.

Birth  
Saeid Hassanipour was born on February 24, 1988, in Rasht. He was the first person to win a gold medal in the Asian Games Tournament -75 kg among Iranian karate players.

Education 
He holds a Bachelor of Science in Civil Engineering and a Masters of Business Administration.

Medals 
Saeid Hassanipour has won several World and Asian Karate Championships for youth, hopes and adults. He was named the only Gilanian gold man in Incheon by winning the gold medal in 2014 Asian Games. Hassanipour won the gold medal at the Asian Championships in Dubai, UAE at the 2013 Asian Karate Championships and won silver at the Islamic Countries Championships in Indonesia 2013. The champion added two more silver medals to the Qatar International Karate Championships and the Turkish World League Championships to the Iranian karate history in 2013. He won a silver medal in the World League Championships in France 2010, and won the gold medal in the Asian Hope Championship in Malaysia, 2008. Saeid Hassanipour's other honors include winning a silver medal in the World Hope Championship in Turkey 2007, a bronze medal in the U21 Karate Asia Championships in Singapore 2006, and a gold medal in the World Youth Championship in Cyprus 2005.

Coaching records 
Saeid Hassanipour was appointed as coach of the national karate team in 2016. He has coached the Youth Karate Team in the World Championships in 2016, the Hope international Team in the Asian Championships in 2016, as well as coaching Guilan's selected Karate team in the Asian champion league. After that he has been responsible for coaching the Adult National Team in the Asian Championship in Kazakhstan 2018, coaching the Adult National Team in the French, Turkish and Emirates World Leagues, coaching the Adult National Team at the Spanish World Championships, coached Iran's Hope National Team at the Spanish and Austrian World Championships at the World Leagues. This Iranian karate player also coached the Adult National Team in the Turkish World League, the Russian World Championship and the Asian Championship in Uzbekistan 2019. He is currently in charge of coaching the National Adult Team to participate in the Tokyo Olympics 2020.

Professional activities 
Saeid Hassanipour became a member of the National Olympic Committee's Athletes Commission in 2017. He is the representative of Iran at the Asian Olympic Committee's Athletes Commission and in 2017 he became Vice President of the National Olympic Committee's Athletes Commission. He was also appointed ambassador of health by Hope Health Club in 2018.

References

Sources 
 en.farsnews.com
 en.irna.ir
 www.karaterec.com
 sportdata.org

External links 
 https://en.farsnews.com/newstext.aspx?nn=13930710000650
 https://en.irna.ir/news/2739649
 http://www.karaterec.com/en/competitors/said-hassanipoursefatazgomi

1988 births
Living people
Iranian male karateka
Asian Games gold medalists for Iran
Asian Games medalists in karate
Karateka at the 2014 Asian Games
Medalists at the 2014 Asian Games
People from Rasht
Sportspeople from Gilan province
20th-century Iranian people
21st-century Iranian people
Islamic Solidarity Games competitors for Iran